The Patriotic Humanitarian Movement is a minor Greek political party.

Founded on 8 August 2008, it is led by Georgios Dontas.

It came last in the 2009 European Parliament elections in Greece.

On 11 September 2009, it was announced that the party would contest the 2009 general election on the ticket of the Democrats party.

Electoral results

References

Political parties in Greece
Political parties established in 2008